The Major Dhyan Chand Award, officially known as Major Dhyan Chand Award for Lifetime Achievement in Sports and Games, is the lifetime achievement sporting honour of the Republic of India. The award is named after hockey wizard Major Dhyan Chand (1905–79), an Indian legendary field hockey player who scored more than 1000 international goals during a career which spanned over 20 years from 1926 to 1948. It is awarded annually by the Ministry of Youth Affairs and Sports. Recipients are selected by a committee constituted by the Ministry and are honoured for their contributions to sport both during their active sporting career and after retirement.

Instituted in 2002, the award is given only to the disciplines included in the events like Olympic Games, Paralympic Games, Asian Games, Commonwealth Games, World Championship and World Cup along with Cricket, Indigenous Games, and Parasports. The nominations for a given year are accepted till 30 April or last working day of April. A nine-member committee evaluates the nominations and later submits their recommendations to the Union Minister of Youth Affairs and Sports for further approval.

The first recipients of the award were Shahuraj Birajdar (Boxing), Ashok Diwan (Hockey), and Aparna Ghosh (Basketball), who were honoured in 2002. Usually conferred upon not more than three sportspersons in a year, a few exceptions have been made (2003, 2012–2013, and 2018–2020) when more recipients were awarded.

Nominations

The nominations for the award are received from all government recognised National Sports Federations, the Indian Olympic Association, the Sports Authority of India, the Sports Promotion and Control Boards, and the state and the union territory governments with not more than two eligible sportspersons nominated for each sports discipline. The Sports Promotion and Control Boards of various Governments organizations includes the All India Police Sports Control Board, Army Sports Control Board, Railways Sports Promotion Board, Indian Navy Sports control Board, Air Force Sports Control Board, Petroleum Sports Promotion Board, Air India Sports Promotion Board, SAIL Sports Promotion Board. In case of cricket, the nominations are received from the Board of Control for Cricket in India as there is no National Sports Federation recognised by the Government. The Sports Authority of India (SAI) is authorised to submit the nominations on behalf of all the de-recognised or under suspension National Sports Federations. The previous award recipients of Rajiv Gandhi Khel Ratna, Arjuna Award, Dronacharya Award, and Dhyan Chand Award can also nominate one sportsperson for the discipline for which they themselves were awarded. The Government can nominate up to two sportspersons in deserving cases where no such nominations have been received from the nominating authorities. The nominations for a given year are accepted till 30 April or last working day of April.

Selection process

All the received nominations are sent to SAI and concerned National Sports Federations for verification against the claimed achievements. The National Anti-Doping Agency is responsible for providing doping clearance. Any sportsperson who is either penalised or being investigated for use of drugs or substances banned by the World Anti-Doping Agency is not eligible for the award along with the  previous award recipients of Major Dhyan Chand Khel Ratna Award, Arjuna Award, and Dronacharya Award. A committee consisting of the Joint Secretary and the Director/Deputy Secretary of Department of Sports, the Secretary and the Executive Director/Director (TEAMS) of SAI verify and validate the nominations.

The valid nominations are considered by a selection committee constituted by the Government. This nine member committee consists of a Chairperson nominated by the Ministry; four members who are either Olympians or previous recipients of the Rajiv Gandhi Khel Ratna, Arjuna or Dhyan Chand awards; two sports journalists/experts/commentators; one sports administrator; and the Director General of SAI and the Joint Secretary of Department of Sports; with not more than one sportsperson from any particular discipline being included in the committee. The medals won in various International championships and events in disciplines included in Summer and Winter Olympic and Paralympics Games, Asian Games, and Commonwealth Games are given 70% weightage. The remaining 30% weightage is given for contributions made towards promotion of sports after the candidates retirement from an active sporting career. For any other games not included in Olympic, Asian Games, and Commonwealth Games like cricket and indigenous games, individual performances are taken into consideration. The sportsperson with maximum points is given 70 marks, while the remaining candidates are given marks in proportion to the maximum points. For team events, marks are given per the strength of the team. Following are the points defined for medals at the given events:

For a given discipline, not more than two sportspersons, one male and one female, are given highest marks. The committee may not recommend the award to the sportsperson with the highest marks across disciplines but can only recommend the recipient of the highest aggregate marks in a particular sports discipline. The recommendations of the selection committee are submitted to the Union Minister of Youth Affairs and Sports for further approval.

Recipients

Controversies

In August 2015, the Ministry announced the award to Romeo James (Hockey), Shiv Prakash Mishra (Tennis), and T. P. Padmanabhan Nair (Volleyball). A Public-Interest Litigation was filed in the Madras High Court by Paralympic athlete Ranjith Kumar Jayaseelan. The petitioner mentioned that he submitted the nomination after fulfilling the criteria by getting 60% for medals and 30% for contributing for sports promotion. Kumar requested to annul the award announced on three recipients. The Court ordered a notice to the Ministry seeking an explanation about the selection.

Explanatory notes

References

External links

 

Indian sports trophies and awards
Recipients of the Dhyan Chand Award
Awards established in 2002
Lifetime achievement awards
2002 establishments in India
Ministry of Youth Affairs and Sports
Monuments and memorials to Dhyan Chand